William Waldorf "Willy" Astor, 1st Viscount Astor (31 March 1848 – 18 October 1919) was an American-British attorney, politician, businessman (hotels and newspapers), and  philanthropist. Astor was a scion of the very wealthy Astor family of New York City. He moved to Britain in 1891, became a British subject in 1899, and was made a peer as Baron Astor in 1916 and Viscount Astor in 1917 for his contributions to war charities.

Early life and education
William Waldorf Astor was born in New York City. He was the only child of financier and philanthropist John Jacob Astor III (1822–1890) and Charlotte Augusta Gibbes (1825–1887). He studied in Germany and in Italy under the care of private tutors and a governess.

In his early adult years, Astor returned to the United States and went to Columbia Law School, graduating with a LL.B. in 1875. He was called to the United States Bar in 1875. He worked for a short time in law practice and in the management of his father's estate of financial and real estate holdings.

Personal life

Astor married Mary Dahlgren Paul (born 1858, died 22 December 1894) on 6 June 1878. She is buried in Trinity Church Cemetery Manhattan. They had five children:

 Waldorf Astor, 2nd Viscount Astor (born 19 May 1879, died 30 September 1952)
 Pauline Astor (born 1880, died 5 May 1972), married soldier/politician Herbert Spender-Clay (1875–1937) in 1904. They had three daughters.
 John Rudolph Astor (born & died 1881), buried in Trinity Church Cemetery.
 Lt. Col. John Jacob Astor, 1st Baron Astor of Hever (born 20 May 1886, died 19 July 1971)
 Gwendolyn Enid Astor (born 1889, died 1902), no children, buried in Trinity Church Cemetery.

Politics
After some time practicing law, Astor thought he had found his true calling and an opportunity to make a name for himself outside of his family's fortune by entering the political realm. In 1877, with his eyes set on the United States Congress, Astor entered New York City politics as a Republican.

He was elected as a member of the New York State Assembly (New York Co., 11th D.) in 1878; and of the New York State Senate (10th D.) in 1880 and 1881. Astor was likely supported by the boss of the New York State Republican machine, Roscoe Conkling, with whom his family was involved.

In 1880, the Maryland General Assembly voted to rename Beantown in Charles County Maryland "Waldorf" in honor of him.

In 1881, Astor was defeated by Roswell P. Flower as a candidate for the United States Congress. A second attempt at the seat also resulted in defeat. His shy nature could not handle the political attacks on his character. This was the end of his political career. The press used his political failures as fodder for harsh criticisms.

In 1882, President Chester A. Arthur appointed Astor Minister to Italy, a post he held until 1885. He told Astor, "Go and enjoy yourself, my dear boy." While living in Rome, Astor developed a lifelong passion for art and sculpture.

Move to England
Upon the death of his father in February 1890, Astor inherited a personal fortune that made him the second richest man in America. Economists widely agree that John D. Rockefeller was the wealthiest American of that time. 

in 1890 Astor initiated the construction of the luxurious Waldorf Hotel on the site of his former residence. At 13 stories high, it overshadowed the adjacent mansion of his aunt, the socialite Caroline "Lina" Schermerhorn Astor. Lina complained bitterly about the commercial establishment next door. However, in 1897, her son John Jacob Astor IV persuaded her to move away and replaced their mansion with the, slightly larger in height and width, Astoria Hotel, which was operated as an extension of the Waldorf; the complex became the Waldorf-Astoria Hotel.

In the meantime, the friction had blown up into a feud. Aunt Lina also insisted that she, not William's wife Mary, was the Mrs. Astor in New York society, just as she had when that title belonged to her husband's elder brother's wife, Charlotte Astor, when she was alive.

As a result of the conflict, Astor moved with his wife and children to England. He rented Lansdowne House in London until 1893. That year, he purchased a country estate, Cliveden in Taplow, Buckinghamshire, from the Duke of Westminster. In 1899, William Waldorf Astor picked up British citizenship, which drew him further away from American history.

To disappear from public view, in the summer of 1892, Astor faked his own death by having his staff report to American reporters that he had died, apparently from pneumonia. However, the ruse was soon discovered, and Astor was mocked in the press.

In 1895, he built a gothic mansion on London's Victoria Embankment at Two Temple Place overlooking the River Thames. He commissioned architect John Loughborough Pearson to design a $1.5 million building, a "crenelated Tudor stronghold" which he used as an office for managing his extensive holdings.

Astor made several business acquisitions while he lived in London. In 1892, he purchased the Pall Mall Gazette, and in 1893 established the Pall Mall Magazine. In 1911 he acquired The Observer a national newspaper. In 1912 he sold the Magazine, and in 1914 made a present of the Gazette and The Observer, with the building in Newton Street and its contents, to his son Waldorf Astor.

In 1903, he acquired the Hever Castle Estate near Edenbridge, Kent, about 30 miles south of London. The estate of over 3,500 acres had at its centre a castle built in 1270 where Anne Boleyn lived as a child. Astor invested a great deal of time and money to restore the castle, building what is known as the "Tudor Village," and creating a lake and lavish gardens. He also added the Italian Garden (including Fernery) to display his collection of statuary and ornaments.

In 1906, he gave his eldest son Waldorf Astor and his new daughter-in-law, Nancy Witcher Langhorne, the Cliveden estate as well as the Sancy diamond as wedding presents. Nancy Astor (as she became on her marriage) became Britain's first seated female Member of Parliament.

In 1908, building on his success with the Waldorf-Astoria Hotel in New York he financed the Waldorf Hotel in London's West End.

Philanthropy and peerage
Astor became a British subject in 1899. He continued his philanthropic activities, like his father. Among the charities he supported were The Hospital for Sick Children, Great Ormond Street (to which he gave $250,000 in 1903); University College, London (including a gift of £20,000 in 1902 for professorships); the Cancer Research Fund; Oxford University; Cambridge University; the National Society for the Prevention of Cruelty to Children; the British Red Cross Society; Gordon Memorial College, Khartoum; the Soldiers and Sailors Families Association; and the Women's Memorial to Queen Victoria. His gifts to war charities included $125,000 to the Prince of Wales's National Relief Fund; a similar amount to Princess Louise's Officers' Families Fund; $200,000 to the British Red Cross; $25,000 to Queen Mary's Employment Committee; and a similar sum to the Lord Mayor's National Bands Fund. He gave $5,000 to King Edward's Hospital Fund annually starting with its founding in 1897.

In recognition of his work for charity, on January 1, 1916, he was offered and accepted a peerage of the United Kingdom under the title of Baron Astor of Hever Castle in the County of Kent. On June 3, 1917, he was elevated to the rank of Viscount as The Viscount Astor. The elevation was controversial, as some felt that a rich American had bought his way into the English aristocracy.

Death
On October 18, 1919, he unexpectedly died of heart failure in the lavatory of his seaside house at Brighton in Sussex. His ashes were buried under the marble floor of the Astor family chapel (also called the Octagon Temple) at Cliveden.

Bibliography
Valentino: An Historical Romance of the Sixteenth Century in Italy (1885)
Sforza, a Story of Milan (1889)
Pharaoh's Daughter and Other Stories (1890)
The Astor collection of illuminated manuscripts : auction in London, 21st June 1988, Sotheby's: twenty illuminated manuscripts from the celebrated collection of William Waldorf Astor, ...from the library at Cliveden, and subsequently part of the Astor deposit at the Bodleian Library, sold by the order of the Trustees of the astor family, Sotheby's, 1988.

Notes

References

External links

 This article also has a paragraph on William Waldorf Astor.

 This article also has a paragraph on William Waldorf Astor.

William Waldorf Astor papers at the New-York Historical Society
 

|-

1848 births
1919 deaths
American emigrants to England
American magazine publishers (people)
19th-century American newspaper publishers (people)
Columbia Law School alumni
William Waldorf
Republican Party members of the New York State Assembly
Republican Party New York (state) state senators
Ambassadors of the United States to Italy
Viscounts Astor
British newspaper publishers (people)
19th-century British newspaper publishers (people)
Livingston family
19th-century American diplomats
Businesspeople from New York City
Naturalised citizens of the United Kingdom
Politicians from New York City
Waldorf Astoria New York
Barons created by George V
Viscounts created by George V
People from Hever, Kent
19th-century American politicians